Kadachira Sri Thrikkapalam Siva Temple, is an ancient Hindu temple dedicated to Lord Shiva is situated on the banks of the Anjarakandi River at Peralassery of Kannur District in Kerala state in India. The temple is the abode of Dakshinamurthy (is an aspect of the Lord Shiva as a guru/teacher of all types of knowledge). The unique feature of the temple is that there are two idols of equally important in two facets. The both deity of Thrikkapalam temple is Dakshinamurthy and are located in separate sanctum sanctorums facing east. According to folklore, sage Parasurama has installed the idol and the temple is a part of the 108 famous Shiva temples in Kerala. This is one of the three Thrikkapaleeswaram temples mentioned in 108 Shiva temples sothram and other two temples situated in Niranam (Niranam Thrikkapaleeswaram Dakshinamurthy Temple) in Pathanamthitta district and Nadapuram (Nadapuram Iringannur Siva Temple) in Kozhikode district.

Location
The temple is located in Kadachira; on the route of Kannur - Koothuparamba state high way, near to Peralassery junction.

See also
 108 Shiva Temples
 Temples of Kerala
 Niranam Thrikkapaleeswaram Dakshinamurthy Temple 
 Nadapuram Iringannur Siva Temple

Temple Photos

References

108 Shiva Temples
Shiva temples in Kerala
Hindu temples in Kannur district